Pabilsaĝ ( /pabilsaŋ/) or Pabilsag was a Mesopotamian god who was the tutelary deity of the Sumerian city Larak. He is best known as the husband of the medicine goddess Ninisina. 

In late sources he was associated with the constellation Sagittarius.

Name and epithets
The etymology of his name is presently unclear, and past proposals (including "arrow shooter," "the elder (is) the leader" and "presbiter") are regarded as implausible.

The epithets "The wild bull with brindled thigh"  and "hero of Enlil" were sometimes applied to Pabilsag.

Character and iconography

Pabilsag’s original character is difficult to ascertain due to the syncretism which occurred between him and Ningirsu/Ninurta from an early date; it is therefore impossible to tell which aspects constitute his original nature, which were acquired due to syncretism, and which are related to his marriage to Ninisina.

Much like his wife Ninisina he was in part a medicine deity, but he also had a connection to hunting and warfare like Ninurta. It is additionally assumed that he was in part a judge deity, as in the Erabriri temple in Isin he was referred to as “lord high judge,” and it is possible he was sometimes associated with the prison goddess Manungal in his judiciary role Lastly, some sources appear to point at an association with the underworld, possibly due to a connection to either Manungal or Meslamtaea (Nergal).

In art Pabilsag was depicted as a zazzaku, a type of official, identified by Manfred Krebernik as a cadastral officer. Cadastral functions are attested both for him and his wife Ninisina, referred to as "cadastral director of An" on occasion. 

Based on the similarity of a figure sometimes depicted on kudurru (boundary stones) with the representation of Sagittarius in the Dendera Zodiac, it has been proposed that in later times Pabilsag, in his astral aspect corresponding to said constellation (attested in the Hellenistic period), could be represented as a centaur-like archer with a horse's body and a scorpion’s tail.

Worship
Pabilsag is already attested in Early Dynastic documents from Fara (Shuruppak) and Abu Salabikh. His primary cult center was Larak. As attested in records from the 9th year of Amar-Sin’s reign, a festival connected to Pabilsag and Larak involved the travel of Ninisina to this city by boat. 

Another city where the  cult of Pabilsag flourished was Isin, where his temple was the Erabriri, though he was also worshiped in his wife Ninisina’s temple, Egalmah; in turn she could be called the "Lady of Erabriri." A document from Puzrish-Dagan from Ibbi-Sin’s reign attests that offerings were made in Isin for Pabilsag alongside his family: Ninisina, Gunura, Damu and Shumah.

In the Ur III period Pabilsag was worshiped in Lagash, Girsu and nearby settlements like Urub, and in offering lists often appears alongside his wife Ninisina. Some evidence also exists for worship of Pabilsag in Ur (especially the presence of a priestess, NINdigir, of Pabilsag in the city in the Early Dynastic period), Umma (especially during the reign of Shulgi), Nippur (as indicated by presence of gudu priests of this god), Babylon, Assur and Kurba’il.

Association with other deities
Pabilsag's parents were Enlil, the lord of the gods, and Nintur, identified with his wife Ninlil. 

Pabilsag was the husband of Ninisina, a medicine goddess. They are attested together in offering lists, literary compositions and other sources from the Ur III period onward. Cities in which they were worshiped as a couple include Isin, Larak and Lagash.  They are one of the multiple examples of Mesopotamian divine couples consisting of a medicine goddess and a warrior god. In the composition Ninisina and the gods, he is addressed as her “beloved spouse” and it is stated that Ninisina "spent time joyously with him." 

Pabilsag's and Ninisina's children were Gunura, Damu and Šumah (Shumah). I

In late sources from Assyrian cities Assur and Kurba'il (for example the so-called takultu ritual) and from Babylon he is associated with Gula, rather than Ninisina. Attestations of him as husband of Ninkarrak are also known.

Pabilsag was partially syncretised with Ninurta, as seen in the Nippur god list and the late Sultantepe god list. This process most likely began in the Old Babylonian period.

References

Bibliography

External links
 Ninisina and the gods in the Electronic Text Corpus of Sumerian Literature
 Pabilsaĝ's journey to Nibru in the Electronic Text Corpus of Sumerian Literature

Mesopotamian gods
Justice gods
Health gods
War gods